The CS 40 is a Canadian sailboat, that was designed by Tony Castro and first built in 1987.

Production
The boat was built by CS Yachts in Canada, starting in 1987, but it is now out of production.

Design
The CS 40 is a recreational keelboat, built predominantly of fibreglass. It has a masthead sloop rig, an internally-mounted spade-type rudder, a fixed fin keel and displaces .

Variants
CS 40
This model carries  of ballast. The boat has a PHRF racing average handicap of 108 with a high of 108 and low of 108.
CS 40 TM
This tall mast model carries  of ballast, has a mast approximately  taller and carries  of sail. The boat has a PHRF racing average handicap of 93 with a high of 96 and low of 87.
CS 40 TM DK
This tall mast and deep keel model and carries  of ballast, has a mast approximately  taller and carries  of sail. The boat has a PHRF racing average handicap of 93 with a high of 93 and low of 93.
CS 40 WK
This wing keel model carries  of ballast. The boat has a PHRF racing average handicap of 102 with a high of 99 and low of 102.

See also
List of sailing boat types

Similar sailboats
C&C 39
C&C 40
Columbia 40
Hunter 40
Hunter 40.5
Hunter 41
Marlow-Hunter 40

References

Keelboats
1980s sailboat type designs
Sailing yachts
Sailboat type designs by Tony Castro
Sailboat types built by CS Yachts